Shyampur High School, is located at Shyampur. It is 40 km (approximately) from Bankura and 5 km from Saltora.

History
Shyampur High School is one of the oldest schools in Bankura District under Saltora subdivision. It was established in 1949, 2 years after the Indian independence. Shyampur High School is the oldest school of Saltora block. It is a Government Bengali medium higher secondary School under WBCHSE.

The school had hostel facilities, but it has been closed by the Government of West Bengal in 2016.

Subjects
Subjects that Shyampur High School offers are

Language
Bengali
English
Sanskrit

Science(V-X) subjects
Life Science
Physical Science
Geography

Arts subjects
Mathematics
Education (elective subject only for XI-XII)
History
Political Science (elective subject only for XI-XII)

Classes
Classes are maintained according to West Bengal Government chart. Only on Government  holidays the school discontinues classes.

Programmes
A number of programmes are arranged by the school authority.

List of annual programmes 

Source:

References

High schools and secondary schools in West Bengal
Schools in Bankura district
Educational institutions established in 1947
1947 establishments in India